Events from the year 1441 in Ireland.

Incumbent
Lord: Henry VI

Events
 Sadhbh Ó Mailchonaire, became Ollamh Síol Muireadaigh

Deaths

Mailin mac Tanaide Ó Maolconaire, Ollamh Síol Muireadaigh